Stieng (Vietnamese: Xtiêng,) is the language of the Stieng people of southern Vietnam and adjacent areas of Cambodia, and possibly Laos (under the name Tariang). Along with Chrau and Mnong, Stieng is classified as a language of the South Bahnaric grouping of the Mon–Khmer languages within the Austroasiatic language family. In the Austroasiatic scheme, the Bahnaric languages are often cited as being most closely related to the Khmer language.  

There are noted dialects of Stieng, some of which may not be mutually intelligible. However, due to the lack of widely available research, this article will primarily describe the dialect known as Bulo Stieng spoken in the provinces of Bình Phước, Lâm Đồng, Tây Ninh in southwestern Vietnam and Kratié (Snuol District) and Mondulkiri provinces in adjacent areas of eastern Cambodia. Bulo Stieng is spoken in more remote areas of the mountains and jungles alongside its close relative, Mnong.  Other dialects, including Bu Dek and Bu Biek, are spoken in the lowlands and exhibit more influence from Vietnamese.

Unlike many other Mon–Khmer languages, Stieng does not distinguish voice quality, nor is it a tonal language like Vietnamese.  Words may be either monosyllabic or sesquisyllabic.

Phonology

Consonants
Haupers (1969) analyzes Stieng as having 25 consonant phonemes with three-way contrasts of voiced, unvoiced and pre-glottalized with aspiration described as a consonant cluster involving simple (i.e. not pre-glottalized) stops plus . Analyses which include the aspirated series as independent phonemes yield 33 consonants and a five-way contrast.

Consonants appearing in syllable coda are devoiced and unreleased. For the alveolar approximate, the trilled  is found in free variation with the flapped .

Vowels
The Stieng vowel system consists of fifteen monophthongs and two diphthongs. The vowel  is short before  and long elsewhere.
 
Symbols in parenthesis represent allophonic variations.

References

Languages of Cambodia
Languages of Vietnam
Bahnaric languages